Events from the year 1830 in Sweden

Incumbents
 Monarch – Charles XIV John

Events
 December - First issue of Aftonbladet.
 - Royal Swedish Yacht Club is founded
 - Västanfors Church is completed
 - Familjen H*** by Fredrika Bremer
 -  (part 1) by Johan Anders Wadman
 - Alarik eller Wikingarne by Amelie von Strussenfelt

Births
 24 April – ⁣Princess Eugenie of Sweden and Norway, princess   (died 1889) 
 17 May – Louise Michaëli, opera singer   (died 1875) 
 2 September – Josefina Wettergrund, writer   (died 1903) 
 25 November – ⁣Karin Åhlin, educator   (died 1899) 
 - Gumman Strömberg, local profile   (died 1894) 
 - Aurore von Haxthausen, composer   (died 1888)
 - Hilda Sandels, opera singer   (died 1921)

Deaths

References

External links

 
Years of the 19th century in Sweden